The 2017–18 Mascom Top 8 Cup was the seventh edition of the Mascom Top 8 Cup. It was played from 24 November 2017 to 3 March 2018 by the top eight teams from the 2016-17 Botswana Premier League. It was won by Township Rollers.

History
The 2017-18 Mascom Top 8 Cup was the only domestic tournament played in Botswana since the FA Cup was not contested. The winner qualified to represent Botswana in the 2018-19 CAF Confederation Cup, but this honour was given to the runners-up Orapa United since the champions Township Rollers had already qualified for the 2018-19 CAF Champions League. Security Systems were the only debutants in the tournament.

Prize money

The prize money was increased by P100 000 but the rest was kept the same from the 2017 tournament.

 Champions: P1 300 000
 Runners up: P550 000
 Semifinalists: P300 000
 Quarterfinalists: P170 000

Format
The quarterfinals and semifinals were played over two legs both home and away, with only one final in a predetermined venue. Three points were awarded for a win, one point for a draw and none for a loss. Aggregate score was used to determine the winner of a round. Where the aggregate score was equal away goals were used to pick out the victor and if those were equal the tied teams went into a penalty shootout. There was no quarterfinal draw. The teams were seeded based on their position in the table, with the first placed team facing off against the eighth placed team.

Participants

Quarter-finals

Semi-finals
The draw for the semi-finals was conducted on 9 January 2018.

Final

Awards
 Top goalscorer |  Obonwe Maome (4 goals) | Gaborone United
 Player of the tournament |  Maano Ditshupo | Township Rollers
 Goalkeeper of the tournament |  Keeagile Kgosipula | Township Rollers
 Coach of the tournament |  Nikola Kavazovic | Township Rollers
 Referee of the tournament |  Lekgotla Johannes
 Assistant referee of the tournament |  Botsalo Mosimanewatlala

References

External links
2017/18 Mascom Top 8, Botswana Premier League
2017 18 Mascom Top 8 News, Botswana Premier League
2017/18 Mascom Top 8 - Matches and Results, Botswana Premier League

Mascom Top 8 Cup
Football competitions in Botswana
2017 in Botswana sport
2018 in Botswana sport